Bruno Overlaet is a Belgian archaeologist and Professor of Ghent University. He is the Curator of the Iranian collection of the Royal Museums of Art and History, Brussels (Belgium). Overlaet is known for his works on Ancient Near East.
He is a winner of the Farabi Award and is a co-editor of Iranica Antiqua.

Works
 The Iron Age III Graveyard at War Kabud Pusht-i Kuh, Luristan, E. Haerinck, B. Overlaet, 1974
 Bani Surmah: An Early Bronze Age Graveyard in Pusht-i Kuh, E. Haerinck, B. Overlaet · 1974
 The Kalleh Nisar Bronze Age Graveyard in Pusht-i Kuh, Luristan, E. Haerinck, B. Overlaet · 1974 
 The Iron Age III Graveyard at War Kabud (Chavar District), E. Haerinck, B. Overlaet · 2004 
 The Early Iron Age in the Pusht-i Kuh, Luristan, B. Overlaet · 2003 
 Chamahzi Mumah: An Iron Age III Graveyard, E. Haerinck, B. Overlaet · 1998 
 Luristan Excavation Documents: Chamahzi Mumah, E. Haerinck, B. Overlaet · 1998 
 Djub-i Gauhar and Gul Khanan Murdah, E. Haerinck, B. Overlaet · 1999

References

Living people
Belgian archaeologists
Year of birth missing (living people)
Academic staff of Ghent University
Academic journal editors
Farabi International Award recipients
Belgian archivists